Erlend Fredrik Skomsvoll (born 12 May 1969) is a Norwegian jazz musician (piano, keyboards, accordion, and tuba), band leader, composer and arranger, known from his own band Skomsork and the band Wibutee with Live Maria Roggen, Madrugada, and Kaizers Orchestra. He has also cooperated with Nils Petter Molvær, Chick Corea and Pat Metheny.

Career
Skomsvoll was born in Bærum. He was educated at Norges Musikkhøgskole in Oslo, and on the Jazz program at Trondheim Musikkonservatorium (1994–1998), where he contributed with Come Shine (1998–2003). In 2000 he got a trainee position at Midt-norsk jazzsenter from Norsk Kulturråd, and has thus served as a central performer, conductor and arranger for Trondheim Jazz Orchestra, which since 2000 has arranged music for concerts with Pat Metheny, New York Voices and Chick Corea.

Skomsvoll otherwise has collaborated with, among others Konsen Big Band, Marit Sandvik, Kirsti Huke, and Morten Abel. With Mark Adderley he developed the commissioned work for Oslo Filharmoniske Orkester (2004), and in 2005 he collaborated with Madrugada and Bodø Sinfonietta in a production for Nordland Musikkfestuke, as well as with Trondheim Musikkteater in the production «Spor». Skomsvoll was in 2003 awarded De unges Lindemanpris, voted by Christian Eggen, winner of the Lindeman Prize 2003.

He composes all the music to his own «Skomsvoll Orkester» (etablert 1996). Dette ble i 2004 videreført i «Skomsork», bestående av Eirik Hegdal (altsax), Thomas T. Dahl (guitar), Ole Marius Sandberg (bass) og Thomas Strønen (drums and elektronics). The band was nominated for Spellemannprisen for the album Skomsork. In 2008 he led the quartet Skoms with Ola Kvernberg (fiolin), Ole Morten Vågan (bass) and Børge Fjordheim (slagverk) the release of the CD and DVD.

Honors
2001: The Norwegian candidate for the newly established European Jazz Prize
2002: Spellemannprisen in the category Jazz for the album Do do that voodoo (2002), with Come Shine
2014: Buddyprisen awarded by the Norwegian Jazz Federation
2014: Spellemannprisen in the category Classical music, for the album Holberg Variations (2014)

Discography

Solo albums 
With Skomsork
2004: Skomsork (Park Grammofon)

Other projects
2006: Variasjoner (Grappa Music), commissioned work for Vossajazz 2002
2008: 52:29 (Grappa Music), with Skoms (Attached was found Monstermort, DVD 2008)
2009: What If? A Counterfactual Fairytale (MNJ Records), with Trondheim Jazz Orchestra, compositions by Skomsvoll
2014: Holberg Variations (Grappa Music), with Christian Ihle Hadland and 1B1
2017: Louder Than You (Øra Fonogram), with 'Molecules'

Collaborations 
Within Wibutee
1997: Newborn thing (Jazzland)
1999: Blå, Molde (Curling Legs), the track "Dans"

Within Come Shine
2000: Come Shine (Curling Legs)
2002: Do do that voodoo (Curling Legs), awarded Spellemannprisen
2003: In concert (Curling Legs), with Kringkastingsorkesteret at Kongsberg Jazz Festival 2003
2014: Red And Gold (Jazzland)

References

External links
 (in Norwegian)

20th-century Norwegian pianists
21st-century Norwegian pianists
Norwegian jazz pianists
Norwegian jazz composers
Grappa Music artists
Norwegian University of Science and Technology alumni
Living people
1969 births
Musicians from Bærum
Trondheim Jazz Orchestra members
Wibutee members
Come Shine members